During the 1989–90 English football season, Chelsea F.C. competed in the Football League First Division.

The season was the club's 85th year in existence since their foundation in 1905. It was their 54th season within England's highest tier of football and their first season of their current top-flight spell following promotion at the end of the previous season.

First Division

Squad

Transfers

Out
 Joe McLaughlin - Charlton Athletic, £650,000

Top scorers

 Kerry Dixon 20
 Kevin Wilson 14
 Gordon Durie 5
 Steve Clarke 3
 Tony Dorigo 3
 Graham Roberts 3
 John Bumstead 2
 Alan Dickens 1
 Gareth Hall 1
 Graeme Le Saux 1
 David Lee 1
 Kevin McAllister 1
 Ken Monkou 1
 Peter Nicholas 1
 Graham Stuart 1

References

1989-90
Chelsea